Bogataj is a Slovene surname. Notable people with the surname include:

 Jure Bogataj (born 1985), Slovene ski jumper
 Lučka Kajfež Bogataj (born 1957), Slovene climatologist
 Vinko Bogataj (born 1948), Slovene ski jumper
 Urša Bogataj (born 1995), Slovene ski jumper

See also
 

Slovene-language surnames